"Agay Dekh" was the official anthem of the 2022 Pakistan Super League, the seventh season of Pakistan Super League. It is produced and composed by Abdullah Siddiqui, while sung by Atif Aslam and Aima Baig. It was released on 24 January 2022 by TikTok.

Background
When Pakistan Cricket Board (PCB) directed the marketing team to find a sponsor to complete the anthem instead of self-funding, and decided to host a low-scale curtain raiser, TikTok signed-in in January 2022 with two-year partnership for entertainment. PCB chairman Ramiz Raja said that he is "confident that both PCB and TikTok will have major gains to make". Paul Katrib, head of brand marketing and strategy for TikTok in Pakistan, said that they "aim to bring the spirit and passion" and look forward to become "the home of fandom for not just cricket but other sports in Pakistan as well." Besides, fans can share moments on their accounts using hashtag #KhelegaPakistan.

Salman Naseer, Chief operating officer PCB, announced on 13 January that they are excited about collaboration between "Atif Aslam and Aima Baig with Abdullah Siddiqui" for the anthem. Abdullah Siddiqui, who is a music producer, electropop singer and songwriter, and has previously endorsed Peshawar Zalmi in 2021 by anthem "Kingdom", stated that he is honoured to work with PCB. He was also recognised in Forbes 30 Under 30 Asia 2021. This is Aima Baig's second PSL anthem in a row, after she has been in several PSL ceremonies since she performed "Aa Gae Shaan Se Hum" for Quetta Gladiators in 2018, while Atif Aslam was featured once before in 2021 opening ceremony.

As per official statement, the anthem's theme is inspirational and motivational with the lyrics and music aimed to cheer the mood during the COVID-19 pandemic in Pakistan, adding that it urges audiences to look beyond binaries of victory and defeat, and enjoy the game in its purest essence.

Release
The music video, directed by Zeeshan Perwez, has been shot in Lahore during 19 to 21 January; with outdoor at Gaddafi Stadium, and indoor at Bari and Evernew Studios. Few making-of scenes were leaked by some of the fans who were called upon by PCB to attend the shoot. First official teaser was released on official TikTok account of PSL on 23 January, while the anthem was released on 24 January.

Production team Check-Box Media (CBM) shared that it took 10 days in the "entire journey from conceptualisation to release". Abdullah Siddiqui revealed that he got the job based on a demo he had in his mind for months, while they had very little time; the melody came up to him with Natasha Noorani.

Curtain raiser
The curtain raiser was held in National Stadium, Karachi on 27 January, which started with Qaumi Taranah. A documentary by Sharmeen Obaid-Chinoy was played, which narrated 70 years history of international cricket for Pakistan in voice of Ramiz Raja. Three paragliders from Red Bull X-Alps, Austria, were featured; namely Florian Greger, Paul Steiner, and Stefan Muller.

The singers who performed on the anthem, came to stage having official tagline #LevelHai. Prime Minister of Pakistan and former cricketer Imran Khan made an appearance via a recorded video message, followed by live fireworks display.

Personnel
Adapted from music video on YouTube:
 Additional Composition: Maanu, Omer Ahmad, and Atif Aslam
 Writer(s): Natasha Noorani, Sami Khan, Maanu, Mustapha Zafar, Omer Ahmad, and Atif Aslam
 Cinematographer: Ahsan Raza
 Choreographer: Mehar Bano
 Editor: Zeeshan Parwez & Abubakar Siddique
 Stylists:
 Sara Bharwana (Atif Aslam)
 Mavi Kayani, Feeha Jamshed, Ayan Khan (Aima Baig)
 Photography: Areesh Zubair
 Sponsorship management: Transgroup
 Sponsors: Tiktok, Red Bull Pakistan

See also 

 List of Pakistan Super League anthems
 Atif Aslam discography

Notes

References

2022 Pakistan Super League
2022
2022 songs
Atif Aslam songs
Song recordings produced by Abdullah Siddiqui